Abraham del Moral Rando (born 5 July 2001), simply known as Abraham, is a Spanish footballer who plays as a central defender for Villarreal CF B.

Club career
Born in Martos, Jaén, Andalusia, Abraham represented Martos CD, CD Tosiria and Real Jaén as a youth before joining Córdoba CF's youth setup in 2016. He made his senior debut with the reserves on 2 December 2018, starting in a 1–1 Tercera División away draw against Betis Deportivo Balompié.

On 5 June 2019, Abraham moved to Villarreal CF and returned to the youth setup. He was promoted to the C-team also in the fourth division ahead of the 2020–21 campaign, and immediately became a regular starter.

Abraham spent the 2022 pre-season with the reserves, He made his professional debut on 29 August, starting in a 3–0 away loss against Granada CF.

References

External links

2001 births
Living people
Sportspeople from the Province of Jaén (Spain)
Spanish footballers
Footballers from Andalusia
Association football defenders
Segunda División players
Tercera División players
Tercera Federación players
Córdoba CF B players
Villarreal CF C players
Villarreal CF B players